The Bamberg-Breitenau Airfield (ICAO code: EDQA) is the special airfield of the Upper Franconian town of Bamberg, Germany. It was operated by the United States Army from 1945 to 2012 as Bamberg Army Airfield (ICAO code: ETEJ), but was already used mainly for civil air traffic at that time. Today, the airfield is approved for sport and business jets up to 10 t maximum take-off mass (MTOW), a refueling system is available. The airfield is operated by Stadtwerke Bamberg in cooperation with the Aero-Club Bamberg e.V., which is responsible for handling flight operations.

References

External links

Airports in Bavaria
Buildings and structures in Bamberg
1945 establishments in Germany
Airports established in 1945